The Asia Pacific University of Technology and Innovation (colloquially known as APU) is a private university in Malaysia. It was formed in 1993 as the Asia Pacific Institute of Information Technology (APIIT) and was renamed in 2004 after being granted University College status to Asia Pacific University College of Technology and Innovation (UCTI). It has produced more than 40,000 graduates under APIIT with association of Staffordshire University. 51% of its shares are owned by Ekuiti Nasional Berhad.

History 
Asia Pacific Institute of Information Technology (APIIT) was founded in 1993 as part of an initiative by the Malaysian Government to address the shortage of IT Professionals in the country. The newly formed institute was based in Damansara Heights, Kuala Lumpur and offered Diploma courses in computing and IT. In the following year, co-operative links were established with Monash University in Australia, leading to the launch of a twinning program in 1995 for Bachelor's degrees. In 1996, they form a partnership with Staffordshire University in UK. The expansion led to the opening of the Kuala Lumpur city campus in 1997, followed by campuses in Karachi, Pakistan (1998), Colombo, Sri Lanka (2000), Lahore, Pakistan (2000), Panipat, India (2001) and Perth, Australia (2004).

In 2003, the Malaysian campus moved to the new premises at Technology Park Malaysia, which was known as APIIT TPM. In March 2017, the Malaysian campus was moved from within the vicinity of the old premises to the new premises location at Jalan Teknologi 5, Technology Park Malaysia. The old premises now houses "APIIT Sdn Bhd" which cater for IT Professional Development Courses. Semester exams are held regularly at the exam hall located on the ground floor since 2017.

The curriculum had since developed, with the institution being recognize as SUN and Microsoft authorized training center. In 1998, the institution became an SAP University Alliance Partner. In 2001, the institution became a Microsoft Certified Technical Education Center. APIIT attained university college status in 2004, and was renamed to Asia Pacific University College of Technology & Innovation (UCTI) and further renamed to Asia Pacific University of Technology & Innovation (APU) after attaining university status.

Student life 

The Asia Pacific University Student Activities and Representative Council (also known as the SARC), is the official students' union which handles five major events of the year and represent the students, clubs, and societies in any inter-varsity events or collaborations. The SARC is elected annually in January by the university students for a term of 1 year. Unlike most student council from other universities, the SARC does not represent the students in matters pertaining to the university's decision-making process. The SARC student body is governed by the department of student affairs which acts as an advisory board.

See also
 List of universities in Malaysia

References

External links

 APU official website
 APIIT official website

Information technology institutes
Business schools in Malaysia
Universities and colleges in Kuala Lumpur
Information technology schools in Malaysia
Educational institutions established in 1993
1993 establishments in Malaysia
Private universities and colleges in Malaysia